Gabriel Norberto Favale (born 19 July 1967 in Tigre, Buenos Aires) is a retired football referee from Argentina.

Favale has supervised matches in the Argentine first division and received his international FIFA badge in 2004. He has refereed matches in the Copa Libertadores (2006, 2007 and 2008).

References
Profile
worldfootball

1967 births
Living people
Argentine football referees
People from Tigre, Buenos Aires
21st-century Argentine people